Guglielmo Bacci (born 15 April 1955 in Turin) is an Italian football coach of Torres and a former player.

Career

Player
He has played for 4 seasons (34 games, 1 goal) in the Serie A for A.S. Roma and Udinese Calcio.

Coach
On March 2011 he becomes the new coach, until the end of the season, of Torres in the Eccellenza Sardinia in place of the sacked Roberto Ennas.

Since June 2012 he was again the coach of Torres in Serie D.

References

External links

1955 births
Living people
Italian footballers
Serie A players
A.S. Roma players
A.S. Sambenedettese players
Udinese Calcio players
A.C. Perugia Calcio players
Taranto F.C. 1927 players
A.C. Reggiana 1919 players
Ternana Calcio players
Italian football managers
Association football defenders